Henry Cummings "Tillie" Lamar (October 4, 1865 – March 10, 1891) was a college football player.

Early years
Henry Cummings Lamar was born on October 4, 1865 in Augusta, Georgia to Gazaway DeRosset Lamar and Maria Cumming.

Princeton

1885
The season was notable for one of the most celebrated football plays of the 19th century - a 90-yard punt return by Henry "Tillie" Lamar of Princeton in the closing minutes of the game against Yale.  Trailing 5-0, Princeton dropped two men back to receive a Yale punt.  The punt glanced off one returner's shoulder and was caught by the other, Lamar, on the dead run.  Lamar streaked down the left sideline, until hemmed in by two Princeton players, then cut sharply to the middle of the field, ducking under their arms and breaking loose for the touchdown.  After the controversy of a darkness-shortened Yale-Princeton championship game the year before that was ruled "no contest," a record crowd turned out for the 1885 game.  For the first time, the game was played on one of the campuses instead of at a neutral site, and emerged as a major social event, attracting ladies to its audience as well as students and male spectators. The Lamar punt return furnished the most spectacular ending to any football game played to that point, and did much to popularize the sport of college football to the general public.  The play is referred to as the "Lamar run" and it is considered one of the most notable plays of that century; The game is also often referred to as the "Lamar game". His run against Yale in 1885 gave Princeton its only victory over Yale in a decade (1879 - 1888).

Death
Lamar, the grandson of Henry Cumming who conceived of and promoted the construction of the Augusta Canal, died by drowning at the opening of the canal connecting Lake Olmstead with the Savannah River, near Augusta, Georgia.

References

External links
 

1865 births
1891 deaths
19th-century players of American football
American football halfbacks
Princeton Tigers football players
Players of American football from Augusta, Georgia
Deaths by drowning in the United States